Kornat (pronounced ) is an island in the Croatian part of the Adriatic Sea, in central Dalmatia. With an area of 32.44 km2 it is the 16th largest island in Croatia and the largest island in the eponymous Kornati islands archipelago.
It is part of the Kornati National Park, which is composed of a total of 89 islands, islets and rocks.

In the 19th century the island was alternatively known as Insel Incoronata (in German) and Krunarski Otok (in Croatian).

According to the 2001 census, the island had a total population of 7, although there are no permanent settlements on the island.

In recent history, the island became infamous as the site of what was dubbed the "Kornat Tragedy", when a group of firefighters who were flown in as part of the 2007 coastal fires firefighting efforts perished. Twelve out of thirteen men who found themselves surrounded by fire were killed in the event which was the biggest loss of lives in the history of Croatian firefighting.

See also
Kornati Islands
List of islands of Croatia

References

Kornati Islands
Islands of Croatia
Islands of the Adriatic Sea